Agneta Klingspor (4 January 1946 – 2 June 2022) was a Swedish author. Her literary debut, was published during the Swedish feminist movements of 1977, and was controversial upon release. She published several other books, and wrote art criticism for Swedish newspapers.

Early life and education
Agneta Klingspor was born in Lysekil on 4 January 1946, and grew up in the Swedish town of Uddevalla, both of which lie inside Västra Götaland County. She studied literary history and the social sciences.

Career
Her first book,  (English: Do Not Just Cut the Rice), was published in 1977, and relied heavily on her personal journals during the 1960s and 1970s. At the time of publication, she was working in psychiatry. She said in an interview that the popular changes in attitude toward feminism had inspired her to publish the book, and she looked up to the works of women writers Suzanne Brøgger and Erica Jong; she was also inspired by Anaïs Nin. The book was controversial upon release; it was a confessional piece of literature, that sought to make conservative readers confront their beliefs about the genre being feminine, while also seeking to make feminist readers accept the genre as a potential commercial product. The Swedish author Ebba Witt-Brattström said Klingspor was a leader in the feminist movement "when we recreated the world". It was criticised as being too private, even for a diary; for not considering issues that women commonly faced, such as child-rearing; and her sexual writing was seen as "nymphomaniac" by contemporary reviewers.

After Inte skära bara rispa, she published about ten books between 1977 and 1991. The Swedish author Anna-Karin Palm commented that two of these books— and —were particularly meaningful for her, and that they demonstrated a sense of "sincerity that is not entirely common". After 1991, she turned to writing art criticism for the Swedish magazine Expressen and other publications. She wrote other novels after turning to art criticism, and released a collection of photographs in 1997 entitled Minne. She earned grants from the Swedish Academy (2007) and Albert Bonniers Förlag (2008).

The cultural critic Cecilia Alstermark wrote in 2013 that Klingspor's writing should be read because of her observational skills; Klingspor wrote variously of her own personal experiences, but also those of migrants, the homeless, in the northern region of Norrland, and in Iran.

Later life and death 
She died on 2 June 2022, with her friend Birgitta Holm at her side.

References

Citations

General and cited references 

 
 
 
 
 

 

1946 births
2022 deaths
People from Uddevalla Municipality
Swedish novelists
Swedish women novelists
20th-century Swedish writers
21st-century Swedish writers
Agneta